The 1895 All-Ireland Senior Football Championship was the ninth staging of Ireland's premier Gaelic football knock-out competition. Dublin entered the championship as the defending champions, however, they were defeated by Meath in the Leinster final. Tipperary were the champions.

Results

Leinster

Munster

All-Ireland final

Championship statistics

Miscellaneous

 Cavan were part of Leinster championship.
 Meath win their first Leinster title.
 Tipperary like Cork in 1890 won both Hruling and Football double in the same year do again 5 years later in 1900.

References